Veronicella tenax,  common Cuban name is the steak slug, is a species of air-breathing land slug, a terrestrial pulmonate gastropod mollusk in the family Veronicellidae, the leatherleaf slugs.

Distribution
 Cuba - endemic

References

 

Veronicellidae
Gastropods described in 1931
Endemic fauna of Cuba